Three ships of the Royal Navy have borne the name HMS Chesterfield, after the town of Chesterfield, in Derbyshire:

  was a 44-gun fifth rate launched in 1745. She foundered in 1762.
  was a fleet messenger during WWI
  was a Town-class destroyer, originally the US Navy's Clemson-class destroyer . She was transferred to the Royal Navy in 1940 and was sold for scrapping in 1947.

See also
 

Royal Navy ship names